The Christmas Carol is a 1949 low-budget, black and white television special narrated by Vincent Price. Compressing Charles Dickens' classic 1843 story into a half-hour, it is stated to be "the oldest extant straight adaptation of the story" for television. It was originally produced as a syndicated production for airing on 22 stations across the United States on Christmas Day in 1949. It was sponsored by Magnavox and represented that company's first use of television advertising. In 1952, the show was acquired by Consolidated Television Sales for further syndication.

The production is considered primitive by modern standards; it is also noted for misspelling Ebenezer Scrooge's name as "Ebeneezer" in the opening credits. The cast is led by Taylor Holmes as Scrooge and includes an early appearance by Jill St. John, then age 9 and billed as Jill Oppenheim, who plays one of the Cratchit daughters.

The director was Arthur Pierson.

See also
Adaptations of A Christmas Carol
List of Christmas films

References

External links
 

Television shows based on A Christmas Carol
American Christmas television specials